Michel-Dimitri Calvocoressi (2 October 1877 – 1 February 1944) was a French-born music critic and musicologist of Greek descent who was an English citizen and resident from 1914 onwards. He often promoted Russian composers, particularly Modest Mussorgsky, about whom he wrote three book-length studies.

Life
Michel-Dimitri Calvocoressi was born in Marseille, France on 2 October 1877 to Greek parents. In his earliest years he learned Greek, Italian, English and later German; he noted that "I read far more English books than French." At the Ecole Monge high school of Paris, he developed a lifelong interest in geology and mineralogy. 

At first, he studied law at the Lycée Janson de Sailly, and then studied music at the Conservatoire de Paris with Xavier Leroux. He became friends with Maurice Ravel who later dedicated "Alborada del gracioso" from the piano suite Miroirs to Calvocoressi. As a talented polyglot, Calvocoressi began a career in 1902 as a music critic and correspondent for several English, American, German and Russian periodicals. He also translated song texts, opera librettos and books from Russian and Hungarian into French and English. His subject of his first book was Liszt, but he was a strong proponent of Mussorgsky and other Russian musicians.

Calvocoressi lectured at the École des Hautes Études Sociales from 1905 to 1914, teaching about contemporary music. At the onset of World War I, the Greek Calvocoressi found himself unable to serve the French cause. He moved to London and served as a cryptographer. He spent the rest of his life in England, was naturalized, married an English citizen, and wrote the remainder of his books in English. Calvocoressi was a member of the Apaches music society. He died in London on 1 February 1944.

Legacy

Calvocoressi's legacy as a music critic and translator was his advocacy of Russian music. He wrote three books on Modest Mussorgsky and (with his friend Gerald Abraham) Masters of Russian Music (1936). He was the French advisor for Sergei Diaghilev as Diaghilev was introducing Russian arts to the French. After his death Abraham completed and brought to publication both Calvocoressi's Mussorgsky (Master Musicians series, 1946) and his larger study Modest Mussorgsky: His Life and Works (1956).

Writings

References

Citations

Sources

Further reading

External links
 The Michel-Dmitri Calvocoressi Manuscripts – Special Collections at the University of Maryland
 

1877 births
1944 deaths
Writers from Marseille
French people of Greek descent
French music critics
French male non-fiction writers
20th-century French musicologists
French emigrants to the United Kingdom